The Jesus Church is a Charismatic Evangelical church congregation in Oslo.

History
The Jesus Church was started on September 3, 2000 by pastors Stephan Christiansen and Anne Christiansen along with a group of young Norwegians eager to share the life of Jesus Christ. By 2001 the church was also established in Marseilles, France, but this branch has later been shut down.

See also
 Pentecostalism in Norway

References

External links
 

Evangelicalism in Norway
Charismatic churches